Latheron is a small village and civil parish in Caithness, in the Highland area of Scotland, centred on the junction of the A9 with the A99.

The Clan Gunn Heritage Centre and Museum is housed in the old Parish Church (built in 1734). The church was donated to the Society in 1974 and with financial support from the Highlands and Islands Development Board, Caithness District Council and the Scottish Countryside Commission the clan society converted it into a museum; it was officially opened on 22 August 1985.

References

External links 
  Latheron historical notes

Populated places in Caithness
Parishes in Caithness